The CR engine is a ,  or  straight-4 piston engine from Nissan's Aichi Kikai division in Japan. It is an aluminum DOHC 16-valve design. The CR14DE also features Variable Valve Timing on the inlet camshaft.
It was first used in the Nissan K12 Micra/March in March 2002, then the Z11 Nissan Cube in October 2002 in Japan and the European E11 Nissan Note in March 2006
It replaced the similar Nissan CG engine.

Engine reference
The CR engine was manufactured in the following versions - as of 2013 only the CR12DE is still in production.

See also
 Nissan Micra
 Nissan Cube
 Nissan Note
 Nissan AD
 List of Nissan engines

References

CG

Straight-four engines
Gasoline engines by model